Hidalgo: la historia jamás contada is a 2010 Mexican film directed by Antonio Serrano. The film focuses on Mexican Independence leader Miguel Hidalgo y Costilla and his involvement in the Mexican War of Independence. It premiered in Mexico City on September 16, 2010.

Plot 
As punishment for his progressive ideas, the priest Miguel Hidalgo is forced to abandon his wife and children and sent by the ecclesiastical authority to a small town. There, in San Felipe Torres, he helps the local people and produces the stage play Tartuffe. He becomes an enemy of the traditional Puritan faction in the town for his liberal attitude and subversive tendencies.

Cast 
 Demián Bichir as Miguel Hidalgo y Costilla
 Ana de la Reguera as Josefina
 Cecilia Suárez as Amadita
 Miguel Rodarte as José Santos
 Flavio Medina as Mariano Abasolo
 Carolina Politi as Domínguez Beatus
 Andrés Palacios as José María Morelos y Pavón
 Juan Carlos Colombo as Bishop
 Plutarco Haza as Spanish captive
 Odiseo Bichir as Master of Rhetoric
 Raúl Mendéz as Ignacio Allende
 Marco Antonio Treviño as Abad and Queipo
 Silvia Eugenia Derbéz as Manuela Pichardo
 Néstor Rodulfo as Moroccan
 Pablo Viña as Ángel Abella
 Juan Ignacio Aranda as José
 José Antonio Gaona as López
 Yurem Rojas as Young Hidalgo

Production
Director Antonio Serrano was prompted to make a film about the Mexican War of Independence following its bicentenary celebrations in 2010.

The film was shot on location in Guanajuato, San Luis Potosí and Michoacán.

Release and reception
On its release date, 500 copies of film were released in cinemas throughout Mexico. 20th Century Fox's vice-president for Latin America, Eduardo Echevarria, said: "We're talking about one of the biggest releases of all time in terms of number of copies, with a strong campaign behind it."

Demián Bichir won the Colon de Plata award for Best Actor at the Festival de Cine Iberoamericano de Huelva for his portrayal of Miguel Hidalgo.

Music 
The music of the film was composed by Alejandro Giacomán.

References

External links 
 
 
 

2010 films
Mexican historical drama films
2010s Spanish-language films
Films set in Mexico
Films based on works by Molière
Works based on Tartuffe